Analog Brothers were an experimental hip hop band featuring Tracy "Ice-T" Marrow on keyboards, drums and vocals, Keith "Kool Keith" Thornton on bass, strings and vocals, Marc "Mark Moog" Giveand (Raw Breed's Marc Live) on drums, violins and vocals, Christopher "Silver Synth" Rodgers (Black Silver) on synthesizer, lazar bell and vocals, and Rex Colonel "Rex Roland JX3P" Doby Jr. (Pimpin' Rex) on keyboards, vocals and production. Its album Pimp to Eat featured guest appearances by various members of Rhyme Syndicate, Odd Oberheim, Jacky Jasper (who appears as Jacky Jasper on the song "We Sleep Days" and H-Bomb on "War"), D.J. Cisco from S.M., Synth-A-Size Sisters and Teflon.

While the group only recorded one album together as the Analog Brothers, a few bootlegs of its live concert performances, including freestyles with original lyrics, have occasionally surfaced online. After Pimp to Eat, the Analog Brothers continued performing together in various line ups. Kool Keith and Marc Live joined with Jacky Jasper to release two albums as KHM. Marc Live rapped with Ice-T's group SMG. Marc also formed a group with Black Silver called Live Black, but while five of their tracks were released on a demo CD sold at concerts, Live Black's first album has yet to be released.

In 2008, Ice-T and Black Silver toured together as Black Ice, and released an album together called Urban Legends.

In 2013, Black Silver and newest member to Analog Brothers, Kiew Kurzweil (Kiew Nikon of Kinetic) collaborated on the joint album called Slang Banging (Return to Analog) with production by Junkadelic Music. In addition to all this, the Analog Brothers continue to make frequent appearances on each other's solo albums.

Discography
 2000 - 2005 A.D. (single), Ground Control Records/Nu Gruv
 2000 - Pimp to Eat (LP), Ground Control Records/Mello Music Group
 2014 - Slang Banging (Return to Analog), Junkadelic Music

References

External links
Kool Keith's Site
Ultrakeith

Analog Brothers at Discogs

Ice-T
American hip hop groups